Post Oak (Quercus stellata) is a North American species of oak in the white oak section.

Post Oak may also refer to:
Post Oak, Missouri, an unincorporated community in Johnson County
Post Oak, Virginia, an unincorporated community in Spotsylvania County
Post Oak Mall, a shopping mall in College Station, Texas
Post Oak Tree or Tree That Owns Itself, a tree in Alabama
The Post Oak, a mixed-use skyscraper in Houston, Texas
Postoak, Jack County, Texas, a small unincorporated community in Texas which can't be found on Wikipedia